Lieutenant General Sir Edward Gibbs  (c. 1777 – 9 January 1847) was a British Army officer who became Lieutenant Governor of Jersey.

Military career
Gibbs took part in the Ferrol Expedition in 1800 during the War of the Second Coalition and in the retreat to Corunna in 1809 during the Peninsular War. He also commanded 2nd Bn of the 62nd Regiment of Foot under the Duke of Wellington taking part in the Battle of Fuentes de Oñoro in 1811 and the Siege of Ciudad Rodrigo in 1812. He commanded a brigade at the Siege of Badajoz in March 1812 before commanding the 1st Bn of the 52nd Regiment of Foot at the Battle of Vitoria in 1813. He then went to the Netherlands and took part in the bombardment of Antwerp in 1814.

He was appointed Lieutenant Governor of Jersey in 1838 and died in office in 1847. He was also briefly Colonel of the 68th Regiment of Foot in 1844 before transferring as Colonel to the 68th (Durham) Regiment of Foot (Light Infantry) (1844 to his death in 1847).

References

1777 births
1847 deaths
52nd Regiment of Foot officers
68th Regiment of Foot officers
Knights Commander of the Order of the Bath
British Army lieutenant generals
British Army personnel of the Peninsular War
Governors of Jersey